Parton railway station is a railway station serving the village of Parton in Cumbria, England. It is owned by Network Rail and managed by Northern Trains. 

Immediately north and south of Parton, the line runs almost on the seashore, at the foot of cliffs which require supervision and occasional stabilisation to prevent landslides. Sea erosion is also a danger, and 15 m.p.h speed restrictions are in force over much of the section between here and Harrington, which is restricted to a single line.

There was a signal box immediately to the north of the station that formerly controlled this section, but this was closed and demolished due to its deteriorating condition in May 2010 (control passing to the adjacent box at Whitehaven Bransty).

Facilities
There are no permanent buildings here other than brick shelters on each platform.  The station is not staffed and anyone wishing to travel must buy their ticket on the train or in advance, as no ticket machine is available. Train running information is provided by telephone, digital CIS screens and timetable posters.  No step-free access is available to either platform.

Services

There is generally an hourly service northbound to Carlisle and southbound to Whitehaven with most trains going onward to Barrow-in-Furness (no late evening service operates south of Whitehaven). A few through trains operate to/from Lancaster via the Furness Line.

Train operator Northern introduced a regular through service to Barrow via the coast at the May 2018 timetable change, the first such service south of Whitehaven for more than 40 years.  Services run approximately hourly from mid-morning until early evening, with later trains terminating at Whitehaven.  This represents a major upgrade on the former infrequent service of four per day each way to/from Whitehaven only that previously operated.

References

External links

 
 

Railway stations in Cumbria
DfT Category F2 stations
Former London and North Western Railway stations
Railway stations in Great Britain opened in 1847
Northern franchise railway stations
Railway request stops in Great Britain
1847 establishments in England